is a 2015 Japanese anime television series produced by Wit Studio. The logo of this title contains the text, "Rolling, Falling, Scrambling Girls. For others. For themselves. Even if they're destined to be a 'mob'".

Plot
Ten years after the end of the "Great Tokyo War" that rocked Japan, most of the country's political and economic elites mysteriously vanished. As a result, the country split up into the original 10 prefectures that soon became independent city-states that competed with each other. Many vigilantes who fought in the aforementioned war became hired as the "Best" (mosa), representing their prefectures in territorial disputes. Their supporters, the "Rest" (mob), work to support them while maintaining the peace within their respective prefectures.

After a prolonged battle with Kuniko leads her friend, Masami to become seriously injured, a rookie Rest named Nozomi decides to travel around Japan on her motorcycle with her new friends, fulfilling requests for Maccha Green while they seek to grow stronger and search for special heart-shaped jewels, the moonlight stones. It is said that the moonlight stone can make a person possesses unlimited power when it is worn, especially by Bests of different regions when combat or fight happens in order to protect themselves, but may lead to serious consequences such as injury of people and damage of properties because of the force emitted by the battle or the people who used it. In reality, it is used as a fuel by aliens in outer space to operate their spaceship.

Characters

Main characters

Sole daughter of the Moritomo family and a normal girl whose family runs the Moritomo Restaurant in Tokorozawa. The protagonist and a new recruit of the Hiroshi Town Propellers. A childhood friend of Masami who seeks to grow stronger on her own and loves her as her sister. Her favourite food is the Melonpan. She admires Masami so much and later becomes the Hiyoshi Town Propellers trainee.

A runaway from the same town as Nozomi. She has a poor sense of direction. Due to her shy personality, she is quite polite when speaking with others. She was once protected by the Suzumoto family.

An upbeat girl who was kicked out of the Rest of Higashi Murayama Kitatama Dangers after trying to save the Hiroshi Town Propellers who were taken hostage. She is quick to resort to brute force when things go wrong. Ends up joining Nozomi's group.

A small girl who seeks out the heart-shaped power stones carried by the Best. Somehow knows the childhood nicknames of Nozomi, Yukina and Ai. She is the adopted daughter of Haruka Misono, the president of Tokorozawa, but had never reveal her identity to Nozomi and her friends. She is actually an alien from the future and her true form is a small, yellow octopus-like creature.

Tokorozawa and Higashimurayama

A Best who fights for Tokorozawa as the green-suited superhero "", though everyone but Nozomi has correctly guessed that they are the same person. Heavily injured after fighting with Kuniko.

A "legendary executioner" from the Great Tokyo War who wields a giant safety pin in combat. A rival from Masami's past who fights her as a Best of Higashi Murayama until their last battle ends with them both in a hospital.

Kuniko's top subordinate.

President of Tokorozawa and Chiaya's adopted mother. Much like Chiaya, she is also an alien, but from a different species. She is gathering heart stones so that when the time comes, she can return Chiaya home to her real family. She is overprotective of Chiaya keeping her confined to her home with Momiyama, worried that she would get in trouble if she had revealed her true form to others. Her true form is a squid-like alien.

Chiaya's caretaker back at home. He secretly follows the girls on their journey under orders by Haruka to bring Chiaya back home.

Nozomi's mother and Tomomori's wife.

Nozomi's father and Hinayo's husband.

Hiyoshi Town Propellers members
, 
, 
, 
, 
, 
, 
,

Always Comima
, : Best of Always Comima and the leader of the Knights of the Twin Towers, the "cosplay security squad", who goes by the name "Thunderoad". An otaku obsessed with the anime "Fighting Buddies: Rick and Shaw".
, : Member of the Knights of the Twin Towers.
, : Mother of Noriko Suzumoto.
: Cameo appearances only character. An author who temporary resides at the Suzumoto Mansion.
, 
, 
, 
,

Aichi and Mie
, : Best of Mie Motors, operates a free bike taxi service and seeks peace with Aichi.
, 
, 
, : Best of Aichi Tenmusu

Kyoto
, : Best of Kamo Rockers
, 
,

Hiroshima and Okayama
, 
, : Leader of Ishizukuri Stones.
, 
, : She is the adopted daughter of Haru Fujiwara.
, 
, : She is the real mother of Momo Fujiwara, she is also the leader of the Okayama Demons.
,

Media

Manga
The manga series is the backstory of the anime series, written by Yōsuke Miyagi and with art by Bonkara began serialization in Mag Garden's Monthly Comic Garden from October 4, 2014. It also began online serialization in Mag Garden's seinen manga magazine ONLINE MAGAZINE comic BLADE from October 30, 2014. A 4-panel manga adaptation titled Ro~lling Gi~rls Inspiration x Traveler, with art by Sheepbox, also began serialization in Mag Garden's ONLINE MAGAZINE comic BLADE from October 27, 2014.

Anime
An anime television series produced by Wit Studio was announced by Pony Canyon that aired in 2015. The series premiered in Japan on MBS and other stations.

The opening and closing songs are both covers of tracks from seminal Japanese punk rock band The Blue Hearts, "Hito ni Yasashiku" and "Tsuki no Bakugekiki" respectively. Several of the episodes share titles with tracks by The Blue Hearts including "Kitai Hazure no Hito", "Hoshi o Kudasai" and "Yoru no Tōzokudan".

Reception

References

External links
 

Anime with original screenplays
Funimation
IG Port franchises
Mag Garden manga
Mainichi Broadcasting System original programming
Shōnen manga
Tokyo MX original programming
Wit Studio
Yonkoma